Baraat is an abandoned settlement in Bayan-Önjüül sum of Töv Province in Mongolia. Baraat is former Bayan-Baraat sum center. It is 30 km SE from Bayan-Önjüül sum center.

Populated places in Mongolia